The Pan American Men's Handball Championship, also called PanAmericano, was the official competition for senior national handball teams of North, Central, and South America and the Caribbean. It took place every two years and was organized by the Pan-American Team Handball Federation. In addition to crowning the Pan-American champions, the tournament also served as a qualifying tournament for the IHF World Men's Handball Championship. In 2018, the PATHF was folded and the tournament was replaced with the South and Central American Championship and North America and Caribbean Championship.

Summary

Medal table

Participating nations

References

External links
 Handball America Archive (todor66.com)

 
Handball
Pan-American Team Handball Federation competitions
Men's handball competitions
Recurring sporting events established in 1980
1980 establishments in Mexico
Recurring sporting events disestablished in 2018